Jusuf Dajić (born 21 August 1984) is a Bosnian-Herzegovinian former professional footballer who played as a forward.

Club career
Dajić played among others for the AFC Tubize in Belgian First Division, the HNK Šibenik in the Prva HNL and Shanghai East Asia in the China League One.

In the summer 2015, Dajić joined Swiss club NK Pajde Möhlin. He retired in summer 2017 but remained at the club as a part of the club's first team staff. In September 2019, he made his return to the pitch, playing a game for the club against FC Grenchen 15.

International career
Dajić made his debut for Bosnia and Herzegovina in a June 2008 friendly match against Azerbaijan and it remained his sole international appearance.

References

External links
 
 HLSZ profile 
 

1984 births
Living people
People from Doboj
Association football forwards
Bosnia and Herzegovina footballers
Bosnia and Herzegovina international footballers
NK Zvijezda Gradačac players
NK Kamen Ingrad players
Fehérvár FC players
Jeonbuk Hyundai Motors players
A.F.C. Tubize players
HNK Šibenik players
FK Sloboda Tuzla players
Shanghai Port F.C. players
Vasas SC players
BFC Siófok players
First Football League (Croatia) players
Croatian Football League players
Nemzeti Bajnokság I players
K League 1 players
Belgian Pro League players
Premier League of Bosnia and Herzegovina players
China League One players
Nemzeti Bajnokság II players
2. Liga Interregional players
Bosnia and Herzegovina expatriate footballers
Expatriate footballers in Germany
Bosnia and Herzegovina expatriate sportspeople in Germany
Expatriate footballers in Croatia
Bosnia and Herzegovina expatriate sportspeople in Croatia
Expatriate footballers in Hungary
Bosnia and Herzegovina expatriate sportspeople in Hungary
Expatriate footballers in South Korea
Bosnia and Herzegovina expatriate sportspeople in South Korea
Expatriate footballers in Belgium
Bosnia and Herzegovina expatriate sportspeople in Belgium
Expatriate footballers in China
Bosnia and Herzegovina expatriate sportspeople in China
Expatriate footballers in Switzerland
Bosnia and Herzegovina expatriate sportspeople in Switzerland